Thornielee railway station served the smallholding of Thornielee, Scottish Borders, Scotland from 1866 to 1950 on the Peebles Railway.

History 
The station opened on 18 June 1866 by the Peebles Railway. The station was situated south of the A72 and was accessed from a drive from the level crossing to the west. The station was called Thornilee but it was corrected to Thornielee in March 1872. There was no signal box but there was a small goods yard on the up side to the west. It consisted of a single siding accessed from the east with a loop. The station was never busy and closed to both passengers and goods traffic on 6 November 1950.

References

External links 

Disused railway stations in the Scottish Borders
Former North British Railway stations
Railway stations in Great Britain opened in 1866
Railway stations in Great Britain closed in 1950
1866 establishments in Scotland
1950 disestablishments in Scotland